Anhelina Kalinina and Oleksandra Korashvili were the defending champions, but both players chose not to participate.

Asia Muhammad and Taylor Townsend won the title, defeating Louisa Chirico and Katerina Stewart in an all-American final, 6–1, 6–7(5–7), [10–4].

Seeds

Draw

References 
 Draw

Wilde Lexus Women's USTA Pro Circuit Event - Doubles